David Quirk (born 15 February 1981) is an actor and stand-up comedian based in Melbourne, Australia.

Career 
Quirk has been performing stand-up comedy since 2002. In 2006, he was a state finalist in Triple J’s ‘Raw Comedy’ competition, and in 2007 he made his Melbourne International Comedy Festival debut. He appears regularly on the comedy circuit in Australia and has performed internationally, including at the Edinburgh Festival Fringe.

Quirk also has a background in acting. In 2012 he appeared in the comedy series Problems, on Australia's ABC1, and in 2015 he was a guest on Please Like Me. In 2017 he also played the role of Damien in ABC's comedy Rosehaven.

Awards 
Piece of Wood (Comedians' choice), Melbourne International Comedy Festival 2013
Golden Gibbo (with Sam Simmons), Melbourne International Comedy Festival 2010

Personal life 
Throughout his adult life, Quirk has worked in skateboard retail and rides a skateboard, both of which have featured prominently in his comedy material. He is a vegan.

References

External links
 
 
 
 Comedian page at Buxstock Comedy Management

Australian stand-up comedians
1981 births
Living people